Loensia variegata is a species of Psocoptera from the family Psocidae that can be found in Great Britain and Ireland. The species are yellowish-black.

Habitat 
The species feed on ash, beech, birch, hawthorn, oak, and yew. It also likes to feed on apples, pears, and plums.

References 

Psocidae
Insects described in 1799
Psocoptera of Europe